Raman Andreevich Hrabarenka (born 24 August 1992), also known as Roman Andreyevich Graborenko (is a Belarusian professional ice hockey defenceman who is currently playing for Cracovia Kraków in the Polska Hokej Liga, the top league in Poland. He most recently played for HC Neftekhimik Nizhnekamsk of the Kontinental Hockey League (KHL). He previously played within the New Jersey Devils organization of the National Hockey League (NHL), and appeared in one game for them in 2015. Hrabarenka played major junior hockey with the Cape Breton Screaming Eagles and Drummondville Voltigeurs of the Quebec Major Junior Hockey League (QMJHL), before signing as a professional with the Albany Devils of the American Hockey League (AHL) and the top minor-league affiliate for New Jersey, in 2012. He signed with New Jersey in 2013 and continued to play for Albany. Once his contract ended in 2016 he signed with HC Dinamo Minsk for one season before joining Nefekhimik and Kunlun. Internationally Hrabarenka has represented Belarus, and has played in several World Championships.

Playing career
Born in Belarus, Hrabarenka first started to skate when he was 6, and moved to Russia with his parents at age 11. In order to further his hockey career he moved to the United States when he was 16, playing for the Philadelphia Revolution of the Eastern Hockey League.
 
Hrabarenka played major junior hockey with the Cape Breton Screaming Eagles and Drummondville Voltigeurs of the Quebec Major Junior Hockey League.

Undrafted, Hrabarenka made his professional debut with the Albany Devils of the American Hockey League in the 2012–13 season. He was later signed by Albany's parent affiliate, the New Jersey Devils, to a three-year entry level contract on 12 July 2013.

Hrabarenka made his NHL debut during the 2014–15 season. He played against the Tampa Bay Lightning on April 9, 2015.

Not tended a qualifying offer by New Jersey, Hranbarenka became a free agent. Going unsigned throughout the summer, Hranbarenka agreed to a professional try-out with the Toronto Maple Leafs on August 22, 2016. The try-out was unsuccessful, and in December 2016 Hrabarenka returned to Belarus, signing a contract with HC Dinamo Minsk of the Kontinental Hockey League (KHL). He played 17 games for Dinamo during the 2016–17 season, recording 6 points. He then signed with HC Neftekhimik Nizhnekamsk for the 2017–18 season.

After two season stint in the Czech Extraliga with HC Litvínov and HC Bílí Tygři Liberec, Hrabarenka returned to former KHL club, Neftekhimik Nizhnekamsk as a free agent, agreeing to a one-year contract on 15 May 2020.

International play

Hrabarenka's first International Ice Hockey Federation (IIHF) tournament was the 2008 World U18 Championship, where he represented the Belarusian national under-18 team. Belarus finished ninth and was relegated to Division I for the next year. His next appearance was at the 2009 World U18 Championship Division I. At the 2009 tournament he helped Belarus win their group and earn a promotion to the top division for the following year. He also played at the 2012 World Junior Championship Division I.

Hrabarenka made his debut for the senior national team at the 2012. He would play for them again at the 2013, 2014, and 2017 World Championships.

Career statistics

Regular season and playoffs

International

See also
 List of players who played only one game in the NHL

References

External links

1992 births
Living people
Albany Devils players
Belarusian expatriate ice hockey people
Belarusian expatriate sportspeople in Canada
Belarusian expatriate sportspeople in China
Belarusian expatriate sportspeople in Kazakhstan
Belarusian expatriate sportspeople in Poland
Belarusian expatriate sportspeople in Russia
Belarusian expatriate sportspeople in the Czech Republic
Belarusian expatriate sportspeople in the United States
Belarusian ice hockey defencemen
Cape Breton Screaming Eagles players
Drummondville Voltigeurs players
Expatriate ice hockey players in Canada
Expatriate ice hockey players in China
Expatriate ice hockey players in Kazakhstan
Expatriate ice hockey players in Poland
Expatriate ice hockey players in Russia
Expatriate ice hockey players in the Czech Republic
Expatriate ice hockey players in the United States
HC Bílí Tygři Liberec players
HC Dinamo Minsk players
Elmira Jackals (ECHL) players
HC Kunlun Red Star players
HC Litvínov players
HC Neftekhimik Nizhnekamsk players
New Jersey Devils players
People from Mogilev
Sportspeople from Mogilev Region
Undrafted National Hockey League players